The Suat Uğurlu Dam is a rock-fill dam for irrigation and hydro power purposes, located  24 km downstream of Hasan Uğurlu Dam on the River Yeşilırmak 13 km south of Çarşamba town and 25 km east of Samsun in northern Turkey. Originally, it was named the Bolahor Dam.

Suat Uğurlu died following an accident at the construction site of a dam project 24 km upstream together with her husband, an engineer at that site. While Ayvacık Dam was renamed after her husband's name Hasan Uğurlu, this dam was renamed in her memory.

Having a dam volume of 2,151,000 m³, Suat Uğurlu Dam and hydro-electric power plant went in service in 1982. The dam has a storage volume of 182 billion m³ in a reservoir area at normal water surface elevation of 9.7 km2. The storage of Suat Uğurlu Dam is little but controlled by Hasan Uğurlu Hydro Power Plant. The surface of irrigated area by the dam is 83,312 ha. The power plant generates  46 MW power giving annually 273 GWh.

References

External links

Dams completed in 1982
Dams in Samsun Province
Hydroelectric power stations in Turkey
Dams on the Yeşilırmak River
1982 establishments in Turkey